Fatha's Day: An Earl Hines Songbook is an album by pianist John Hicks which was recorded in 2003 and released on the HighNote label. The album features seven compositions written or recorded by Earl Hines and five by Hicks.

Reception
Allmusic reviewed the album stating "More than a few jazz musicians could learn how to make tribute CDs by listening gems such as this one by John Hicks". JazzTimes said "Fatha's Day is completely worth celebrating". All About Jazz observed "Hicks honors Hines without attempting to emulate the elder musician's famous "trumpet style" technique, instead finding inspiration in original compositions and other songs often performed by the Pittsburgh pianist".

Track listing 
All compositions by Earl Hines except as indicated
 "Rosetta" - 4:09
 "Almost Spring" (Mickey Bass) - 7:06
 "Remembering Earl and Marva" (John Hicks) - 3:30
 "Serenata" (Leroy Anderson) - 6:14
 "Poor Butterfly" (John Golden, Raymond Hubbell) - 4:31
 "My Monday Date" - 7:54
 "Fatha's Bedtime Story" (Hicks) - 3:17
 "Sweet and Lovely" (Gus Arnheim, Charles Daniels, Harry Tobias) - 6:17
 "Rhythm Run (Uphill)" (Hicks) - 4:21
 "You Can Depend on Me" (Charles Carpenter, Louis Dunlap, Earl Hines) - 5:39
 "Twelve Bars for Linton" (Hicks) - 4:35
 "Synopsis" (Hicks) - 6:22

Personnel 
John Hicks - piano
Dwayne Dolphin - bass
Cecil Brooks III - drums

Production
Cecil Brooks III - producer
Joe Fields - engineer

References 

John Hicks (jazz pianist) albums
2002 albums
HighNote Records albums
Tribute albums